Lenomyia is a genus of flies in the family Stratiomyidae.

Species
Lenomyia alticola James, 1977
Lenomyia glabra James, 1977
Lenomyia grandis James, 1977
Lenomyia honesta Kertész, 1916
Lenomyia lucens James, 1977
Lenomyia pallipes James, 1977
Lenomyia pyrifera James, 1977
Lenomyia sedlacekorum James, 1977
Lenomyia similis James, 1977

References

Stratiomyidae
Brachycera genera
Taxa named by Kálmán Kertész
Diptera of Asia
Diptera of Australasia